World Economic Forum in Baku – was held in Baku (Azerbaijan) on April 7-8, 2013. “Strategic dialogue on the future of the South Caucasus and Central Asia” was the theme of the forum. More than 200 representatives of business sphere, administration and civil organizations took part at the forum.

Selection of the venue
General agreement about holding of the World Economic Forum in Baku was signed on January 23, 2013 in Swiss Davos, during the meeting of Ilham Aliyev, the President of Azerbaijani Republic and Klaus Schwab, executive chairman of the World Economic Forum.

Aims and targets
Discussion of issues on development of industrial, mineral resources, transportation, infrastructure, agriculture, finance, telecommunication and other sectors was the main goal of the World Economic Forum held in Baku, the main theme of which was “Strategic dialogue on the future of the South Caucasus and Central Asia”.

Forum will be an evaluation platform of main problems and opportunities related to the future of the region and also will contribute to development of cooperation and integration in the South Caucasus and Central Asia.

Program of the forum
Program of the World Economic Forum in Baku consisted of 6 sessions:
 Opening session
 Session on the theme of: “Energy and mineral resources: opportunities and challenges, moving ahead”
 Session on the theme of: “Entrepreneurship and human capital”
 Session on the theme of: “Finance and long-term investing”
 Session on the theme of: “Trade and delivery chain”
 Session on the theme of: “Vision of Azerbaijan: Towards the new economy”

Activity of the forum

Voting
A voting-survey about the future of the South Caucasus and Central Asia was carried out during the forum. According to the results, 62,3% of participants voted for integration of regions, 22% for fragmentation and 15,7% for polarization.

Seminar
On April 7, 2013, the first day of the forum, a seminar called “Media and communication with public for a global youth project” was held. Paulette Hebert – representative of “Around the Rings” sport portal in the Near East and Ed Hula – editor and founder of “Around the Rings” spoke in the seminar.

Participants
 Ilham Aliyev – President of Azerbaijani Republic
 Taner Yıldız – Minister of Energy and Natural Resources of Turkey
 Algirdas Butkevičius – Prime-minister of Lithuania
 Sali Berisha – Prime-minister of Albania
 Prince Andrew, Duke of York
 Gordan Jandroković – Minister of Foreign Affairs and European Integration of Croatia
 Georgi Kvirikashvili – Minister of Economy and Sustainable Development of Georgia
 David Narmania – Minister of Regional Development and Infrastructure of Georgia
 Luvsanvandan Bold – Minister of Foreign Affairs of Mongolia 
 Bakitzan Sagintayev – Deputy prime-minister of Kazakhstan
 Jomart Otorbayev – the first deputy prime-minister of Kyrgyzstan
 Andrey Kostin – chairman and executive director of VTB bank of Russia
 Frederick Star – Chairman of “Central Asia and Caucasus Institution” of Johns Hopkins University
 Victor Halberstadt – Professor of Leiden University of Netherlands
 Gordon Birell – regional president of BP in Azerbaijan, Georgia and Turkey
 J. Carl Ganter – managing director, Circle of Blue
 Peter Sannikov – vice-president of the Russian Direct Investment Fund

References

 
Economy of Azerbaijan
2010s in Baku
2013 in Azerbaijan
2013 in economics